C.U. Shah Medical College, Surendranagar is a medical college located in Surendranagar, Gujarat. It was established in the year 2000. The college imparts the degree Bachelor of Medicine and Surgery (MBBS). Nursing and para-medical courses are also offered. The college is affiliated to Saurashtra University and is recognised by Medical Council of India. The selection to the college is done on the basis of merit through National Eligibility and Entrance Test. Yearly undergraduate student intake is 100.

Courses
C.U. Shah Medical College, Surendranagar undertakes education and training of students MBBS courses. This college is offering 150 MBBS seats from 2019 of which 85% Seats are of state quota and 15% is for Nation Counselling.

References

External links 
 https://cusmc.org/

2000 establishments in Gujarat
Educational institutions established in 2000
Medical colleges in Gujarat